KRVZ (1400 AM) is a radio station broadcasting a News Talk Information format. Licensed to Springerville, Arizona, United States, the station is currently owned by William and Mary Ann Konopnicki through licensee WSK Family Credit Shelter Trust UTA, and features programming from Talk Radio Network.

References

External links

RVZ
Oldies radio stations in the United States
Mass media in Apache County, Arizona